The office of Consul was an honorary title in the Gallic Empire, as an indigenous version of the Roman Consuls.

History
After the Gallic Empire declared independence from the Roman Empire, it no longer recognized the Roman Consuls appointed by the Roman Emperor. Although the office had become entirely ceremonial, the Romans relied upon the consulship in order to date its years, which led the Gallic Empire to establish their own consuls. The office was often held by the Gallic Emperors themselves, a practice which was also copied from the Roman Empire. In the 14 years that the Gallic consulship existed, Postumus held it five times, Victorinus held it two times, Tetricus I held it three times, and Tetricus II held it once. Laelianus, Marius, and Domitianus II never held it, due to the extreme brevity of their reigns.

List of Gallic Consuls

References

Bibliography
 
 
 

Roman consuls
Gallic Empire